The Roman Catholic Metropolitan Archdiocese of Cape Town is a Latin archdiocese of the Roman Catholic Church in Cape Town, in the south-western part of South Africa. 
The archdiocese's motherchurch and its archbishop's see is the cathedral of St. Mary of the Flight into Egypt, who is also the archbishopric's patron.
 
The archdiocese is headed by the Archbishop of Cape Town, the Most Reverend Archbishop Stephen Brislin and is assisted by The Right Reverend Sylvester David OMI, the Auxiliary Bishop.

History 
It was erected as the Apostolic Vicariate of Cape of Good Hope (and adjacent territories) on 18 June 1818 by Pope Pius VII, on territories split off from the then–Territorial Prelature of Mozambique and Diocese of Tomé.

On 4 April 1819, it gained territory from the suppressed Apostolic Prefecture of New Holland.
 
It repeatedly lost territory, to establish: in 1834 the Apostolic Vicariate of New Holland and Van Diemen's Land and again on 6 June 1837 to establish the Apostolic Vicariate of Mauritius.

It was renamed the Apostolic Vicariate of Cape of Good Hope, Western District on 30 July 1847, losing territory to establish the Apostolic Vicariate of Cape of Good Hope, Eastern District.
 
On 3 August 1874, it lost territory to establish the Apostolic Prefecture of Cape of Good Hope, Central District.
 
It was renamed the Apostolic Vicariate of Cape Town on 13 June 1939.

Pope Pius XII elevated it to the rank of a metropolitan archdiocese on 11 January 1951.

On 18 August 1986, it lost territory to establish the Mission sui juris of Saint Helena, Ascension and Tristan da Cunha off its Atlantic Coast.

Extent 
The geographical area of the Archdiocese of Cape Town is divided up into 80 parishes. Each parish is obliged to have its own pastoral council as well as a finance council. Representatives from these parish councils – as well as of other bodies –  together form the Archdiocesan Pastoral Council, whose task it is to advise the archbishop in certain matters.

In total the archdiocese covers an area of 30 892 square kilometres with a total population of 3 324 539 people, of whom 215187 are Catholics. The administrative centre of the archdiocese is called a chancery and is located at 12 Bouquet Street in Cape Town.

Its postal address is P O Box 2910, Cape Town, 8000. The telephone number for all departments in the chancery is (021) 462–2417; the fax number is (021) 461-9330 and the e-mail address is infoatcatholic-
ct.org.za

The archdiocese is centred on the city of Cape Town and includes the southernmost tip of the continent of Africa; its area is bounded on the west by the Atlantic Ocean,
on the north by the southern boundaries of
the Van Rhynsdorp district, on the east by the western boundaries of the Calvinia,
Ceres, Tulbagh, Worcester, Robertson and Swellendam districts, and on the south by the Indian Ocean.
The civil districts within the ecclesiastical area of the archdiocese are the districts of Cape, Wynberg, Simon's Town, Bellville, Somerset West, Stellenbosch, Paarl, Wellington, Caledon,
Bredasdorp, Malmesbury, Piketberg and Clanwilliam.

The Most Reverend Stephen Brislin is the Archbishop of Cape Town:
Born in Welkom on 24 September 1956.
Schooling at St Agnes' Convent, Welkom andCBC, Welkom 
Seminary: Philosophy at St John Vianney, Pretoria and Theology at the Missionary Institute, London
Ordained a priest on 19 November 1983.
Ordained Bishop of Kroonstad on 28 January
2007.
Installed as Archbishop of Cape Town on 7 February 2010, on the Solemnity of Our Lady of the Flight into Egypt, the patronal feast of the Archdiocese of Cape Town.

Context 
The Catholic Church throughout the world is
divided into administrative units called dioceses. Each diocese is headed by a
bishop. In some cases (as in South Africa) those dioceses which are of greater importance are called archdioceses and are headed by an archbishop. In South Africa there are five
such archdioceses, one of which is Cape Town. Each diocesan bishop in the world (ecclesiastically called an ordinary to
distinguish him from other bishops who work in an administrative capacity) is responsible directly to the Pope. In order to facilitate and co-ordinate various matters of national interest such as seminaries, the bishops of South Africa are associated into the Southern African Catholic Bishops Conference (SACBC). This conference is affiliated to two other such conferences: IMBISA (the Inter-regional Meeting of Bishops of Southern Africa) and SECAM (the Symposium of Episcopal Conferences of Africa and Madagascar).
A representative of the Pope was appointed in 1922 as the Apostolic Delegate. In 1994 the Holy See (the diocese of Rome and the Papal administration) and South Africa established diplomatic relations, setting up an Apostolic Nunciature for the Holy See in Pretoria and a South African Embassy in the Vatican.

To help him administer the Archdiocese of Cape Town, the Archbishop has appointed two vicars general.

A chancellor is appointed in each diocese, whose task it is to act as a notary or
someone who authenticates any official document which the archbishop might issue.
To help in the ministry of the various departments of the Archdiocese of Cape
Town, a number of priests have been appointed as vicars or heads of those
departments. Together with an equal number of other
priests elected by the priests serving in Cape Town, these constitute the presbyteral council, and it is from this body that the
archbishop chooses his consultors or advisors.

In order to co-ordinate the pastoral function of the various parishes in Cape
Town, five deans have been elected by the priests as their spokesmen in certain
matters. The body of deacons constitutes the Council of Deacons and the Archbishop appoints a
co-ordinator as a liaison between himself and the deacons.

Province 
The ecclesiastical province comprises the Metropolitan's own archdiocese and the suffragan sees :
 Roman Catholic Diocese of Aliwal
 Roman Catholic Diocese of De Aar
 Roman Catholic Diocese of Oudtshoorn
 Roman Catholic Diocese of Port Elizabeth
 Roman Catholic Diocese of Queenstown.

Bishops
all Roman Rite

Ordinaries of Cape Town 
 Apostolic Vicars of Cape of Good Hope and adjacent territories
 Edward Bede Slater, O.S.B. (1818.06.18 – 1831; died 1832), Titular Bishop of Ruspæ (1818.06.18 – 1832.07.15)
 Dr. William Placid Morris, Order of Saint Benedict (O.S.B.) (1831.08.09 – 1837.06.06), later Apostolic Vicar of Mauritius (Mauritius) (1837.06.06 – 1840); remained Titular Bishop of Troas (1831.08.09 – 1872.02.18)
 Patrick Raymond Griffith, Dominican Order (O.P.), Titular Bishop of Paleopolis (Asia Minor) (1837.06.06 – 1862.06.18) (6 June 1837 – 1847.07.30 see below)

 Apostolic Vicars of Cape of Good Hope, Western District
 Patrick Raymond Griffith, O.P. (see above 1847.07.30 – 18 June 1862)
 Thomas Grimley (18 June 1862 - 1871.01.29), Titular Bishop of Antigonea (1860.12.18 – 1871.01.29); succeeding as former Coadjutor Apostolic Vicar of Cape of Good Hope, Western District (1860.12.18 – 1862.06.18)
 Dr. John Leonard (1872.10.1 – 19 February 1908), Titular Bishop of Charadrus (1872.10.01 – 1908.02.19)
 Dr. John Rooney (1908.02.19 – 1925), Titular Bishop of Sergiopolis (antea Resapha) (1886.01.29 – 1927.02.26); succeeding as previous Coadjutor Vicar Apostolic of Cape of Good Hope, Western District (1886.01.29 – 1908.02.19)
 Bernard Cornelius O'Riley (1925.07.15 – 1932.06.06), Titular Bishop of Phoba (1925.07.15 – 1956.07.21)
 Franziskus Hennemann, Pallottines (SAC) (1933.06.30 – 1939.06.13 see below), Titular Bishop of Coptus (1913.07.16 – 1951.01.17); previously djutor Vicar Apostolic of Cameroun (Cameroon) (1913.07.16 – 1914.11.07), succeeding as Vicar Apostolic of Cameroun (Cameroon) (1914.11.07 – 1922.06.26), next Apostolic Prefect of Cape of Good Hope, Central District (1922.06.26 – 1933.06.30)

 Apostolic Vicars of Cape Town
 Franziskus Hennemann, S.A.C. (see above 1939.06.13 – 1949; died 1951)
 Owen McCann (1950.03.12 – 1951.01.11 see below), Titular Bishop of Stectorium (1950.03.12 – 1951.01.11)

 Metropolitan Archbishops of Cape Town
 Dr. Owen (Cardinal) McCann (see above 1951.01.11 – 1984.10.20; died 1994), also President of the Inter-Regional Meeting of Bishops of Southern Africa (1961 – 1974), Cardinal-Priest of S. Prassede (1965.02.25 – 1994.03.26), President of the Southern African Catholic Bishops' Conference (1967 – 1974)
 Dr. Stephen Naidoo, Congregation of the Most Holy Redeemer (C.SS.R.) (1984.10.20 – 1989.07.01); previously Titular Bishop of Mammilla (1974.07.01 – 1974.08.02); Auxiliary Bishop of Cape Town (1974.07.01 – 1984.10.20), Titular Bishop of Aquæ Flaviæ (1974.08.02 – 1984.10.20)
 Dr. Lawrence Patrick Henry (1990.07.07 – 2009.12.18), previously Titular Bishop of Cenculiana (1987.04.27 – 1990.07.07) & Auxiliary Bishop of Cape Town (1987.04.27 – 1990.07.07)
 Dr. Stephen Brislin (18 December 2009 – ...), also President of Inter-Regional Meeting of Bishops of Southern Africa (2012.08 – ...), President of Southern African Catholic Bishops' Conference (2012.10 – ...); previously Bishop of Kroonstad (South Africa) (2006.10.17 – 2009.12.18)

Coadjutor Vicars Apostolic 
Thomas Grimley (1860-1862)
John Rooney (1886-1908)

Auxiliary Bishops
Reginald Cawcutt (1992-2002)
Sylvester Anthony John David, O.M.I. (2019-)
Lawrence Patrick Henry (1987-1990), appointed Archishop here
Stephen Naidoo, C.SS.R. (1974-1984), appointed Archishop here

Other priests of this diocese who became bishops
Francisco Fortunato de Gouveia, appointed Bishop of Oudtshoorn in 2010
Ernest Arthur Green, appointed Bishop of Port Elizabeth in 1955
Noel Andrew Rucastle, appointed Bishop of Oudtshoorn in 2020

See also 
 Roman Catholicism in South Africa

References

External links
 Official site
 GCatholic.org, with incumbent biography links
 Catholic-Hierarchy 
 catholic-ct.org.za

Roman Catholic Archdiocese of Cape Town
Christianity in Cape Town
Religious organizations established in 1818
Roman Catholic dioceses and prelatures established in the 19th century
1818 establishments in South Africa
 
A